Bukit Canberra (Chinese: 武吉坎贝拉; pinyin: Wǔ Jí Kǎn Bèi Lā) is an integrated sports and community hub next to Sembawang MRT station. The hub houses facilities including an indoor sports hall, the largest ActiveSG gym in Singapore, a six-lane sheltered swimming pool, and an eight-lane lap pool. There will also be 3 km of running trails, of various difficulties, passing throughout the development. It will also house a polyclinic, a senior care centre, and a hawker centre.

Bukit Canberra will be the second such community hub in Singapore, after Our Tampines Hub in Tampines. It will open in phases, with the entire development expected to be fully operational by Q1 2023.

History
The development was previously part of the demolished Chong Pang Village, which housed a wet market and hawker centre before the 1980s.

Facilities
The integrated sports and community hub will provide Sembawang residents with amenities such as a hawker centre, polyclinic, a senior care centre, a childcare centre, and several parks.

Hawker Centre
The 800-seat food and beverage facility has 43 operational stalls, selling a variety of Asian food, including halal food and Indian fare. About one-tenth of the stalls are operated by Sembawang residents.

Sports Hub
Apart from five swimming pools, including an Olympic-sized one, and the biggest ActiveSG gym in Singapore, the Bukit Canberra Sports Hub will also feature an indoor sports hall
It can accommodate 12 badminton courts, or three basketball or volleyball courts. It also has a retractable seating gallery that can hold up to 500 people.

Polyclinic and Senior Care Centre
In addition to a focus on providing primary care for ageing population in the northern part of Singapore, the polyclinic will offer medical services for acute and chronic diseases, as well as women's health such as cervical and breast cancer screening.

Library
The Canberra House, formerly known as the Admiralty House, will be converted into a public library in 2024.

References 

Places in Singapore